Le Grand Meaulnes is the only novel by French author Alain-Fournier, who was killed in the first month of World War I. The novel, published in 1913, a year before the author's death, is somewhat autobiographical – especially the name of the heroine Yvonne, for whom he had a doomed infatuation in Paris. Fifteen-year-old François Seurel narrates the story of his friendship with seventeen-year-old Augustin Meaulnes as Meaulnes searches for his lost love. Impulsive, reckless and heroic, Meaulnes embodies the romantic ideal, the search for the unobtainable, and the mysterious world between childhood and adulthood.

Title
The title, is French for "The Great Meaulnes". The difficulties in translating the French grand (meaning big, tall, great, etc.) and le domaine perdu ("lost estate/domain/demesne") have led to a variety of English titles, including The Wanderer, The Lost Domain, Meaulnes: The Lost Domain, The Wanderer or The End of Youth, Le Grand Meaulnes: The Land of the Lost Contentment, The Lost Estate (Le Grand Meaulnes) and Big Meaulnes (Le Grand Meaulnes).

Le Grand Meaulnes inspired the title of F. Scott Fitzgerald's novel The Great Gatsby. Despite this similarity, French translators of Fitzgerald's novel struggled in the same way to render the word "great", and chose Gatsby le magnifique (literally Gatsby the Magnificent).

Plot summary
François Seurel, the 15-year-old narrator of the book, is the son of M. Seurel, who is the director of the mixed-ages school in a small village in the Sologne, a region of lakes and sandy forests in the heartland of France. François is intrigued when 17-year-old Augustin Meaulnes, a bright young man from a modest background, arrives at the school. Because of his height, Augustin acquires the nickname "grand" ("tall"). He becomes a hero figure to the class and runs away one evening on an escapade where, after getting lost, he chances on a magical costume party where he is enchanted by the girl of his dreams, Yvonne de Galais, a character inspired by the real-life Yvonne de Quiévrecourt. She lives with her widowed father and her somewhat odd brother Frantz in a vast and ancient family château – Les Sablonnières – which has seen better days. The party was being held to welcome Frantz and the girl he was to marry, Valentine. However when she does not appear, Frantz attempts suicide but fails.

After returning to school, Meaulnes has only one idea: to find the mysterious château again and the girl with whom he has now fallen in love. However his local searches fail while at the same time a bizarre young man shows up at the school. It is Frantz de Galais under a different name trying to escape the pain of having been rejected. Frantz, Meaulnes, and François become friends, and Frantz gives Meaulnes the address of a house in Paris where he says Meaulnes will find his sister, Yvonne de Galais. Meaulnes leaves for Paris only to learn no one lives in the house anymore. He writes to his friend François Seurel: "...it is better to forget me. It would be better to forget everything".

François Seurel, who has now become a school teacher like his father, finally manages to find Yvonne de Galais and reunites her with Meaulnes. Yvonne still lives with her aging father in what is left of the old family estate, "Les Sablonnières", which is closer than the two young friends had first imagined in earlier years. Yvonne de Galais is still single and confesses to Meaulnes that he is and has always been the love of her life. Yvonne de Galais accepts, with her father's blessings, Augustin Meaulnes' marriage proposal. However, the restless Meaulnes leaves Yvonne the day after their wedding in order to find her lost brother Frantz (whom he had once promised to help) and re-unite him with his fiancée Valentine. Yvonne remains at the château, where she gives birth to a little girl but dies two days later. Eventually François lives in the house Meaulnes and Yvonne lived in and raises the little girl there, while waiting for the return of his friend Meaulnes. While looking through old papers François discovers a handwritten diary by Meaulnes. During the years in Paris (before François brought Meaulnes and Yvonne back together), Meaulnes had met and romanced Valentine, the fiancée who had jilted Frantz on the night of the party.

Meaulnes does return, after a year and eight months, having brought Frantz and Valentine back together. He discovers that Yvonne has died and left a daughter, whom he claims. Four years have elapsed since the beginning of the story.

Translations
As of 2012, several English translations were available:
 by Françoise Delisle as The Wanderer in 1928.
 as The Lost Domain (1959) by Frank Davison.
 as Meaulnes: The Lost Domain (1966) by Sandra Morris.
 as The Wanderer or The End of Youth  (1971) by Lowell Bair.
 as Le Grand Meaulnes: The Land of the Lost Contentment (1979) by Katherine Vivian.
 as The Lost Estate (Le Grand Meaulnes) (2007) by Robin Buss.
 as Big Meaulnes (Le Grand Meaulnes) (2012) by Jennifer Hashmi.

Adaptations

Le Grand Meaulnes was featured on the BBC Radio 4 programme Book at Bedtime, recorded in 1980 and repeated in 1999. A two-part serialisation by Jennifer Howarth was broadcast as the Classic Serial in August 2005.

The book was made into a film by Jean-Gabriel Albicocco in 1967. Another film adaptation (Le Grand Meaulnes) was released in November 2006, starring Jean-Baptiste Maunier, Clémence Poésy, and Nicolas Duvauchelle.

"Meaulnes the Great" is the title of a 2014 bas-relief (130 cm x 140 cm) carved in limewood by the French artist Jean-Louis Berthod from Albens, Savoy. The relief was inspired by Alain-Fournier's book and is a tribute to the missing people of World War I.

The book is the inspiration for the song 'My Yvonne', the ninth track from UK singer-songwriter Jack Peñate's debut album, Matinée, featuring backing vocals from a then unknown Adele. Adele is not credited as a featured artist on the song; however, she is credited as a backing vocalist in the album's booklet.

Appearances in other works
Le Grand Meaulnes is the only book that Sal Paradise carries with him on his travels, in Jack Kerouac's On the Road.

In the work To Live to Tell the Tale of Gabriel García Márquez,    he remembers a crew mate from his youth that was an insatiable reader and had this as one of the books that would later become one of the author's preferred literary masterpieces.

See also

Le Monde 100 Books of the Century

References

Further reading
 Robert Gibson (1986) Critical Guides to French Texts, Grant & Cutler Ltd., London

External links

 
  Le Grand Meaulnes, audio version  – Latest French audio version 
 Places in Le Grand Meaulnes

1913 French novels
French bildungsromans
French romance novels
Novels set in France
Works published under a pseudonym
French novels adapted into films
1913 debut novels